is one of the 16 wards of the city of Nagoya in Aichi Prefecture, Japan. As of 1 October 2019, the ward had an estimated population of 163,555 and a population density of 9,330 persons per km². The total area was 17.53 km².

Geography
Kita Ward is the north of the center of the city of Nagoya.

Surrounding municipalities
Nishi Ward
Moriyama Ward
Naka Ward
Higashi Ward
Kasugai
Kitanagoya
Toyoyama

History
Kita Ward was founded in 1944. Its area was expanded in 1946 with an addition from Higashi-ku and again in 1951 with an addition from Naka-ku. In 1955, the village of Kusunoki, formerly part of Nishikasugai District was annexed by Nagoya city, and joined to Kita Ward.

Economy
Kita Ward is largely a regional commercial center and bedroom community for central Nagoya.
Ōzone Sub CBD
Mets Ōzone（Higashi-ku）
Mitsubishi Electric Corporation Nagoya Factory（Higashi-ku）
OZ Garden
OZ Mall

Education

University
Aichi Gakuin University
Nagoya Sangyo University Satellite campus
Nagoya Zokei University

Transportation

Railroads
Meitetsu - Meitetsu Seto Line
  -  	
Meitetsu - Meitetsu Komaki Line
  - 
Nagoya Municipal Subway – Meijō Line
  – – – - 
Nagoya Municipal Subway – Kamiiida Line
  ––

Highways
Nagoya Expressway 
Japan National Route 19 
Japan National Route 41 
Japan National Route 302

Local attractions

Meijō Park
Tonarino
Nagoya Airfield
Ozmall

References

Wards of Nagoya